Greater San Fernando del Valle de Catamarca is an urban agglomeration around the city of San Fernando del Valle de Catamarca in Catamarca Province, Argentina. It has a population of 171,923 inhabitants , making it the 20th most populous metropolitan area in Argentina.

San Fernando
Geography of Catamarca Province